The Impersonator  is a 1961 low-budget black and white British thriller film  directed and co-written by Alfred Shaughnessy. An American angle  and U.S. character actor John Crawford were incorporated to give this second feature some transatlantic box office appeal.

Plot
In an effort to improve relations between a US air force base and the sleepy local English village nearby, airman Sergeant Jimmy Bradford  organises a school trip to see the pantomime "Mother Goose". Meanwhile a prowling killer is on the loose and after a night out with the victim, the finger of suspicion points at Bradford.

Cast
John Crawford – Sgt. Jimmy Bradford
Jane Griffiths – Ann Loring 
Patricia Burke – Mrs Lloyd 
John Salew – Harry Walker
John Dare – Tommy Lloyd
John Arnatt – Detective Superintendent Fletcher
Yvonne Ball – Principal boy in "Mother Goose"
Edmund Glover – Colonel
Frank Thornton as Police Sergeant

Critical reception
Writing in The Radio Times, David Parkinson gave the film two out of five stars, saying, "it's shoestring stuff, but still better than most British B-movies." Britmovie called the film an "excellent British B-thriller produced by Bryanston on a budget of £23,000 that is a cut above the majority of second features."

It was one of 15 films selected by Steve Chibnall and Brian McFarlane in The British 'B' Film, their survey of British B films, as among the most meritorious of the B films made in Britain between World War II and 1970. They called it "exceptionally proficient" and noted that the critics Penelope Gilliatt and Dilys Powell had also praised it at the time of its release.

References

External links
 

1961 films
1960s English-language films
British thriller films
British independent films
British black-and-white films
1960s thriller films
1961 independent films
1960s British films